Bader Yousef Mohammed Mousa (born 11 April 1999) is a Palestinian professional footballer who plays as a forward for Egyptian club El Entag El Harby and the Palestine national team.

Club career 
On 1 December 2020, Mousa joined Egyptian Premier League club El Entag El Harby from Khadamat Rafah on a three-year contract. On 29 January 2021, Mousa was loaned out to Ghazl El Mahalla for the remainder of the season. He made his debut on 17 April, as a 70th-minute substitute in a 2–2 draw against Pyramids. Mousa's debut as a starter came on 14 May, in a 2–1 home defeat to Al Masry.

International career 
Mousa made his international debut for Palestine on 3 June 2021, coming on as a substitute in a 4–0 win against Singapore in the 2022 FIFA World Cup qualification.

Career statistics

International

References

External links
 
 
 
 

1999 births
Living people
People from Rafah Governorate
Palestinian footballers
Association football forwards
El Entag El Harby SC players
Ghazl El Mahalla SC players
Gaza Strip Premier League players
Egyptian Premier League players
Palestine youth international footballers
Palestine international footballers
Palestinian expatriate footballers
Palestinian expatriate sportspeople in Egypt
Expatriate footballers in Egypt